The Battle of Gravelines was fought on 13 July 1558 at Gravelines, near Calais, France. It occurred during the twelve-year war between France and Spain (1547–1559).

The battle resulted in a victory by the Spanish forces, led by Lamoral, Count of Egmont, over the French, led by Marshal Paul de Thermes. The Spanish were supported by the English Navy, who opened fire on the French as they reached the sand dunes at Gravelines.

Following the dominance of the Spanish forces, led by Duke Emmanuel Philibert of Savoy, at the Battle of St. Quentin, Henry II of France prepared his revenge. He recruited a new army in Picardy, which he put in the hands of Louis Gonzaga, Duke of Nevers. He asked the Ottoman Sultan for naval support and encouraged the Scots to invade England from the north. Francis, Duke of Guise, seized the port of Calais from the English and moved to capture the city of Thionville in Philip II's duchy of Luxembourg on 22 June 1558. Marshall de Thermes invaded with another army consisting of 12,000 infantry and 2,000 cavalry, armed with a considerable amount of artillery. After crossing the river Aa at its mouth, de Thermes commandeered his army to conquer both Dunkirk and Nieuwpoort, consequently threatening Brussels. It is reported that a Spanish army was to later intercept the duke's army at the Aa River.

Development of the battle

The Duke of Savoy and Philip met an army of 15,000 infantry and 3,000 cavalry, giving the command to the Count of Egmont. Surprised by the speed of the Spanish maneuver, Thermes had to do battle because he had the river behind him, the sea on his left, and his right completely blocked by the baggage column of his own army. He deployed his army on the left bank of the river, creating a double line with the cavalry and artillery in one row and the infantry in a second row behind them.

Sighting the French positions, Egmont placed his troops in a crescent, with the light cavalry on the flanks and the Spanish troops, together with the German and Flemish units, in the center.

The French used their artillery, and a chaotic battle was fought between the cavalry of both sides. The Spanish arquebusiers, who were better armed and trained, peppered the French cavalry. They then shot at the infantry sheltered behind the baggage train, creating great confusion among the French ranks. Egmont, at the head of his horsemen, decided to attack the French center with his cavalry. Biscay and English ships under Admiral Edward Clinton bombarded the French rear, causing numerous casualties. The outcome of the battle could not have been worse for the French: only 1,500 men had managed to flee; the rest lay dead or were taken prisoner. The lord of Thermes was taken prisoner. The French were forced to retreat to the border.

This defeat, coupled with the loss at the Battle of St. Quentin (1557), forced Henry II of France to make peace with Philip II in the Peace of Cateau-Cambresis of 1559. It was because of this treaty that Philip II married Elisabeth of Valois, daughter of Henry, while Emmanuel Philibert, Duke of Savoy married Margaret of France, Duchess of Berry, sister of Henry and daughter of King Francis I of France.

References

1558 in France
Gravelines 1558
Gravelines 1558
Gravelines 1558
Gravelines 1558
Gravelines 1558
Italian War of 1551–1559